Next to Her (At Li Layla) is a 2014 Israeli drama film directed by Asaf Korman and written by Liron Ben-Shlush. It was selected to be screened as part of the Directors' Fortnight section of the 2014 Cannes Film Festival.

Cast
 Dana Ivgy as Gabby
 Liron Ben-Shlush as Chelli
 Yaakov Zada Daniel as Zohar
 Liat Goren as Shifra
 Varda Ben Hur as Shosh
 Carmit Messilati-Kaplan as Jenny
 Sophia Ostrisky as Sveta

References

External links
 
 

2014 films
2010s Hebrew-language films
2014 drama films
Israeli drama films
2014 directorial debut films